Bhavani Shankar  is an Indian pakhawaj drum player.

Bhavani Shankar was born into a  musical family, beginning his study of pakhawaj and tabla at the age of eight. His father Babulalji was a renowned Kathak performer, a style of Indian classical dance. He has played with many Indian artists including bansuri player Hariprasad Chaurasia, santoor player Shiv Kumar Sharma and tabla players Zakir Hussain and Anindo Chatterjee. In the last years he has made his mark as a composer for films and experimental fusion projects.

References

External links
Itunes.apple.com
Nytimes.com
Thehindu.com
Timesofindia.indiatimes.com

Pakhavaj players
Hindustani instrumentalists
Indian percussionists
Recipients of the Sangeet Natak Akademi Award